The Carlos Palanca Memorial Awards for Literature winners in the year 1984 (rank, title of winning entry, name of author).


English division
Novel
Grand prize: “Vaya Con Virgo” by Wilfrido D. Nolledo

Short story
First prize: “The Reprieve” by Susan Lara
Second prize: “The Tangerine Gumamela” by Sylvia Mendrez Ventura
Third prize: “Stranger in an Asian City” by Gregorio Brillantes; and “The Little Wars of Filemon Sayre” by Lemuel Torrevillas

Poetry
First prize: “Configuring the Gods and Other Poems” by Ma. Luisa A. Igloria; and “Voyage: Poem” by Edgardo B. Maranan
Second prize: “Gossamer” by Simeon Dumdum, Jr.; “Port of Entry” by Felix Fojas; and “Waiting for Lobregat” by Fidelito Cortes
Third prize: “February 1899” by Alfredo N. Salanga; “Moving with the Wind” by Susan Pe; and “Songs in Three Continents” by Bing Caballero

Essay
First prize: “Climate of Disaster, Season of Disgrace” by Gregorio Brillantes
Second prize: “The Socio-political Implication in the Fiction of F. Sionil Jose” by Ricaredo Demetillo
Third prize: “Tales of the Subdivided” by Jose Y. Dalisay Jr.

One-act play
First prize: “Claudia and Her Mother” by Rolando S. Tinio
Second prize: “Lunch” by Alexander Lee
Third prize: “A Showcase of Basic Sentiments” by Renato L. Zamora

Full-length play
First prize: No winner
Second prize: No winner
Third prize: “The Squirrels” by Herminia Sison
Special mention “Gironiere” by Florencio Quintos

Filipino division
Novel
Grand prize: “Bata, Bata, Paano Ka Ginawa” by Lualhati Bautista; and “Bata, Sinaksak, Isinilid sa Baul” by Tony Perez

Short story
First prize: “Sa Kadawagan ng Pilikmata” by Fidel Rillo, Jr.
Second prize: “Gamugamo sa Kalawakan” by Dong Delos Reyes
Third prize: “Ang Huling Itineraryo ng Pulo-pulong Utak ni Propesor Balisungsong” by Pat V. Villafuerte

Poetry
First prize: “Bakasyunista” by Tomas F. Agulto
Second prize: “Isang Mamamayan ng Lungsod at Iba pang Tula” by Virgilio S. Almario
Third prize: “Mga Tugma ng Paglikha, Mga Talinhaga ng Pagpuksa” by Fidel Rillo, Jr.;  and “Sa Bibig ng Bulkan at Iba pang Krisis” by Teo T. Antonio

Essay
First prize: “Mga Titik sa Dambuhalang Bato” by Lilia Quindoza Santiago
Second prize: “Si Lam-ang, Si Fernando Poe, Jr. at si Aquino” by Isagani R. Cruz
Third prize: “Mga Tinig ng Pagtutol” by Edgardo B. Maranan

One-act play
First prize: No winner
Second prize: “Punla ng Dekada” by Rene O. Villanueva
Third prize: “Kalapating Dagat” by Jose Y. Dalisay Jr.

Full-length play
First prize: “Sigwa” by Rene O. Villanueva
Second prize: “Juego de Prendas” by Bonifacio Ilagan
Third prize: “Mga Puntod” by Ruth Elynia S. Mabanglo

References
 

Palanca Awards
Palanca Awards, 1984